Khormarud-e Shomali Rural District is a rural district (dehestan) in the Central District of Azadshahr County, Golestan Province, Iran. At the 2006 census, its population was 11,805, in 2,844 families.  The rural district has 10 villages.

References 

Rural Districts of Golestan Province
Azadshahr County